James Ross Strait, an arm of the Arctic Ocean, is a channel between King William Island and the Boothia Peninsula in the Canadian territory of Nunavut.
Islands in the channel include the Clarence Islands, Tennent Islands, Beverley Island, and Matty Island.

A number of polar explorers searching for the Northwest Passage sailed through the strait, including Roald Amundsen. The strait is named after British polar explorer James Clark Ross.

References 
James Ross Strait - Entry in the Columbia Gazetteer of North America on Bartleby.com

Straits of Kitikmeot Region
Canadian Arctic Archipelago